Madden NFL 2005 is an American football simulation video game based on the NFL that was developed by EA Tiburon, along with Exient Entertainment and Budcat Creations, and published by EA Sports. The 16th installment of the Madden NFL series, it features former Baltimore Ravens linebacker Ray Lewis on the cover. Al Michaels and John Madden return as game commentators. Released on August 9, 2004, the game is the first Madden game to feature Xbox Live. It was the last Madden game to be released on the original PlayStation, and the first Madden game to be released on the Nintendo DS, where it was a launch title.

Soundtrack
The Madden NFL 2005 soundtrack was:
 will.i.am – "Go!"
 Green Day – "American Idiot"
 Hoobastank – "Same Direction"
 Z-Trip featuring Soup of J5 – "Listen to the DJ"
 Earshot – "Wait"
 Jazze Pha – "Da Heavy Hittas"
 New Found Glory – "This Disaster"
 Wylde Bunch – "Last Day of School"
 Alter Bridge – "Open Your Eyes"
 Yung Wun – "Yung Wun Anthem"
 Chevelle – "The Clincher"
 JR Ewing – "Time ta Get Dirty"
 Midtown – "Give It Up"
 The D.O.C. vs. Earshot – "The Madden Re-Match"
 Franz Ferdinand – "Take Me Out"
 Ozomatli – "Saturday Night"
 Hazen Street – "Fool the World"
 The Hives – "Two Timing Touch and Broken Bones"
 Strata – "Piece by Piece"
 Faith No More – "From Out of Nowhere (Throwback Track Powered by Rhino)"
 The Mooney Suzuki – "Alive & Amplified"

Reception

Depending on the platform, the game was met with mixed reviews to universal acclaim according to Metacritic, while frequently being compared to its competitor ESPN NFL 2K5. The game has also been heavily criticized for its questionable soundtrack, which was a common recurrence throughout the series. GameRankings and Metacritic gave it a score of 90.33% and 91 out of 100 for the PlayStation 2 version; 90% and 90 out of 100 for the GameCube version; 89.50% and 91 out of 100 for the Xbox version; 83.73% and 85 out of 100 for the PC version; 80% and 79 out of 100 for the Game Boy Advance version; and 69.07% and 68 out of 100 for the DS version. GameSpot named it the best Xbox and PlayStation 2 game of August 2004. IGN called the PS2 version the 98th best PlayStation 2 game due to its AI quality and graphics. The staff also claimed that it beat out ESPN NFL 2K5 due to EA's video game exclusivity deal with the NFL.

ESPN NFL 2K5 was the first in the 2K series priced at $19.99 the day it shipped, much lower than market leader Madden NFL at $49.99. This greatly reduced Madden sales that year; one EA Sports developer recalled that "[i]t scared the hell out of us". EA reduced Madden NFL 2005s price to $29.95. In December 2004 EA Sports acquired an exclusive rights agreement with the NFL and NFLPA to be the sole creator of NFL video games.

	
The game sold more than 4 million copies.

References

External links

Madden NFL
2004 video games
Game Boy Advance games
GameCube games
Nintendo DS games
Palm OS games
PlayStation (console) games
PlayStation 2 games
Xbox games
Windows games
EA Sports games
Video games developed in the United States
Spike Video Game Award winners
Exient Entertainment games
Multiplayer and single-player video games
Budcat Creations games